Dean Court, currently known as the Vitality Stadium for sponsorship purposes, is a football stadium in Kings Park, Boscombe, a suburb of Bournemouth, Dorset, England, and the home ground of AFC Bournemouth.

History
In 1910, Boscombe F.C. was given a piece of land by the town's Cooper-Dean family, after whom the ground was named. The land was the site of an old gravel pit, and the ground was not built in time for the start of the 1910–11 season. As a result, the club played at the adjacent King's Park until moving into Dean Court in December 1910. However, the club facilities were still not ready, and players initially had to change in a nearby hotel. Early developments at the ground included a 300-seat stand.

In 1923, the club were elected to Division Three South of the Football League, at which point they changed their name to Bournemouth & Boscombe Athletic. The first Football League match was played at Dean Court on 1 September 1923, with 7,000 watching a 0–0 draw with Swindon Town. Subsequent ground improvements were made following the purchase of fittings from the British Empire Exhibition at Wembley, which allowed the construction of a 3,700-seat stand. A covered terrace was added at the southern end of the ground in 1936.

The club's record League attendance was set on 14 April 1948, when 25,495 watched a 1–0 defeat to QPR. The overall record attendance was set on 2 March 1957, when 28,799 spectators watched an FA Cup match against Manchester United. Shortly afterwards, a roof was added to the western stand. The club also purchased more land behind the northern end of the ground, with the intention of enlarging the stand and building a leisure centre. However, the club ran out of money during its construction and abandoned the scheme in 1984. As a result, the half-built structure was demolished and housing was built on that part of the site. The club's lowest Football League attendance was set on 4 March 1986, when only 1,873 saw a 2–2 drawn with Lincoln City.

The ground was completely rebuilt in 2001, with the pitch rotated ninety degrees from its original position and the ground moved away from adjacent housing. Because the work was not finished in time for the start of the 2001–02 season, Bournemouth played their first eight games at the Avenue Stadium in nearby Dorchester. When Dean Court reopened with a game against Wrexham on 10 November, it gained its first sponsored name, becoming the Fitness First Stadium. Although it was rebuilt as a three sided stadium with a capacity of 9,600, seats were placed on the undeveloped south end in the autumn of 2005. On 24 February 2004 Bournemouth's James Hayter scored the Football League's fastest-ever hat-trick at Dean Court, scoring three goals in 2 minutes and 20 seconds during a 6–0 victory over Wrexham. The club sold the stadium in December 2005 in a sale-and-leaseback deal with London property company Structadene.

In the 2010–11 a temporary south stand was built, but was removed during the 2011–12 season after attendances fell. In July 2011 the stadium was renamed the Seward Stadium after the naming rights were sold to the Seward Motor Group. Following Seward entering administration in February 2012, the ground was subsequently renamed the Goldsands Stadium in a two-year deal. During the summer of 2013 a 2,400 seat stand was built on the undeveloped end of the ground as a result of the club's promotion to the Championship. In July 2013 it was named after former club striker Ted MacDougall.

Further redevelopment
In August 2014, chairman Jeff Mostyn revealed that the club were looking at the possibility of redeveloping the stadium rather than moving to Matchams. With a limited capacity of 11,464 (considered small even for a League One/Tier 3 club), the club were exploring the option of building a new, permanent stand and filling-in the stadium's corners, bringing the total seating to around 14,000, should they continue to be successful in the Premier League. The naming rights changed once more in July 2015 when the stadium became the Vitality Stadium.

In May 2016, Bournemouth announced that they would not be adding new capacity to its ground in time for the next Premier League season. The club has taken the decision to delay redevelopment plans following a meeting of its board. A statement from the Cherries blamed "ongoing negotiations with the club's landlord to purchase the stadium". The club had previously said improving the stadium's size was needed as "demand for tickets far outweighs our current capacity". Dean Court was the smallest ground in the Premier League.

In December 2016 the club announced plans to find a new site due to the ongoing issues regarding ownership of the ground.

In July 2017 the club confirmed it was looking to build a new stadium near the current site in Kings Park.

Damage under Storm Eunice
In February 2022, the stadium was damaged by Storm Eunice, an unusually intense storm. It caused an EFL Championship game against Nottingham Forest, scheduled for 18 February, to be postponed.

Other events
In 2013 both England Ladies and Under 16 sides played games at the ground. The stadium has also been used for music concerts, hosting Elton John in 2006.

England international games

England under-21 games

England under-20 games

England under-16 games

England women games

References

External links

History of AFC Bournemouth
Football Ground Guide Article

AFC Bournemouth
Football venues in England
Premier League venues
Buildings and structures in Bournemouth
Event venues established in 1910
Sport in Bournemouth
Sports venues in Dorset
English Football League venues